Dhamhar is a village in Bikapur tehsil, Faizabad district (now Ayodhya district) in the Uttar Pradesh state of India. 

Dhamhar is very close to Haiderganj town. Dhamhar is 43km south of district headquarters Ayodhya city. It is the birthplace of freedom fighter Sarju Prasad Dubey.

The pincode of Dhamhar is 224205 and Dhamhar comes under Khapradih post office. Dhamhar is a part of Goshainganj Vidhan Sabha constituency and Ambedkar Nagar Lok Sabha constituency.

Transport

Road 
Dhamhar is well connected with nearby cities Faizabad, Ayodhya, Akbarpur, Sultanpur. And Dhamhar is also well connected  with Chaure Bazar, Tarun, Bikapur, Bhiti and Goshainganj towns due to very close to Haiderganj town.

Railway 
Chaure Bazar, Kurebhar, Goshainganj, Faizabad Junction and Ayodhya Junction are nearby railway stations.

Air 
Ayodhya Airport is the nearest airport to Dhamhar.

References

Villages in Faizabad district